Ashlee Simpson is an American singer-songwriter, dancer and actress. She is signed with Geffen Records and as of April 2008, has released 3 studio albums Autobiography, I Am Me, and Bittersweet World.

In 2004 Autobiography was certified 3× Platinum by the RIAA and was one of the best selling albums of that year making Simpson rose to prominence and be nominated on several music awards. Simpson's first ever nomination was for her work in 7th Heaven, where she played Cecilia Smith, a supporting role. Simpson's also ranked in Billboard Decade End Chart (2000–2010) with Autobiography in the # 149 place and as Billboard 200 Artists in the # 145 place. Also Simpson made the ARIA Decade End Chart selling more than 300,000 singles and ranking in the top 350.

Her Outta My Head (Ay Ya Ya) music video won Best Art Direction at the 2008’s MVPA Awards. The award recipient was the production designer Evan Rohde.

ASCAP Awards
The American Society of Composers, Authors and Publishers (ASCAP) is a not-for-profit performance rights organization that protects its members' musical copyrights by monitoring public performances of their music, whether via a broadcast or live performance, and compensating them accordingly. Simpson has received one award.

|-
| 2005 || Pieces of Me || ASCAP Award Most Performed Songs ||  
|-

Billboard Music Awards
Billboard Music Awards winners in many categories have been announced by Billboard both in the press and as part of their year-end issue. Simpson was recognized during a live televised show in 2004.

|-
||2004 || rowspan=2|Herself || Best New Female Artist of the Year ||   
|-

BMI Awards
The Broadcast Music, Incorporated (BMI) Awards is an annual award show hosted for the purpose of giving awards to songwriters. Songwriters are selected each year from the entire BMI catalog, based on the number of performances during the award period.
At the 53rd annual BMI awards, "Pieces of Me", a song co-written by Ashlee Simpson, John Shanks and Kara DioGuardi, took home the honor, "BMI Award Winning Song".

|-
| 2006 || "Pieces of Me" || Winning Song || 
|-

Bravo Super Show Awards

|-
| 2008 || Outta My Head (Ay Ya Ya) || Best Song||

Golden Raspberry Awards
A Golden Raspberry Award, or Razzie for short, is an award presented in recognition of the worst in movies. Founded in 1981. Ashlee was nominated twice on the same year but lost to Paris Hilton.

|-
| rowspan="2" style="text-align:center;"|2006
|Herself (Undiscovered) 
|Worst Supporting Actress 
|
|-
|Herself (with Jessica Simpson and Nick Lachey) 
| Most Tiresome Tabloid Targets
|
|-

Groovevolt Music and Fashion Awards

|-
| 2005 || Pieces of Me || Best Song Performance - Female ||

Japan Gold Disc Awards
The Japan Gold Disc Awards are an annual ceremony hosted in Japan. The winner are based by sales provided by The Recording Industry Association of Japan (RIAJ).

|-
| 2005 || Herself || Japan Gold Disc Award for Best New Artist ||

MTV Awards

MTV Asia Awards
The MTV Asia Awards were established in 2002 by MTV Networks Asia to celebrate the most popular music videos in Asia. Simpson has been nominated twice, winning one.

|-
| style="text-align:center;"| 2005 ||Herself || Favorite Breakthrough Artist || 
|-
| style="text-align:center;"| 2006 ||Herself || Favorite Female Artist ||

MTV Video Music Awards
The MTV Video Music Awards is an annual awards ceremony established in 1984 by MTV. Ashlee Simpson has received two nominations.

|-
|  || Pieces of Me || Best Pop Video || 
|-
|  || Invisible || Best Cinematography || 
|-

MTV Australia Awards
The MTV Australia Awards is a music video awards show presented annually on MTV. Simpson has been nominated three times.

|- 
| 2005 || Pieces of Me || Best Pop Artist – International || 
|-
|rowspan="2"| 2006 || rowspan="2"| Boyfriend || Best Female Artist|| 
|-
| Best Pop Video|| 
|}

Los Premios MTV Latinoamérica
Los Premios MTV Latinoamérica is the Latin American version of the MTV Video Music Awards. Simpson has received three nominations.

|-
|rowspan="2"| 2005 || rowspan="2"| Ashlee Simpson || Best New Artist – International|| 
|-
| Best Pop Artist – International|| 
|-
| 2006 || Ashlee Simpson || Best Pop Artist – International ||

MTV Video Music Awards Japan

|-
| 2005 || rowspan="2"| "Pieces of Me" || Best New Artist||

Spin Awards

|-
| rowspan="3" style="text-align:center;"|2005
|rowspan="3"|Herself  
|Worst Dressed
|
|-
|Worst Live Act
|
|-
|Worst Solo Artist
|
|-

Stinkers Bad Movie Awards

|-
| align="center" rowspan="2" |2006
| Smart in a Stupid Way
| rowspan="2" style="text-align:center;"|Worst Song or Song Performance in a Film or Its End Credits 
| 
| 
|-
| Undiscovered
| 
|-

Teen Choice Awards
The Teen Choice Awards is an annual fan voted awards show established in 1999 by the Fox Broadcasting Company. Ashlee Simpson has received four nominations, which she has won 2 awards.

|-
| 2003 || Herself || Choice TV Breakout Star – Female: 7th Heaven || 
|-
| rowspan="2"|2004 || Herself || Choice Fresh Face ||  
|-
| Pieces of Me || Choice Song of the Summer ||  
|-
| 2005 || Herself ||  Choice TV Personality: Female ||

TRL Awards
Simpson received during an episode of Total Request Live on MTV channel this award representing how she did a strong comeback with her sophomore number one album I Am Me

|-
| 2006 || Herself || TRL Award for Bounce Back Artist||

Virgin Media Music Awards

|-
|2008
|Outta My Head (Ay Ya Ya) 
|Worst Track
|
|-

World Music Awards
The World Music Awards is an international awards show. It was established in 1989 that annually honors recording artists based on worldwide sales figures provided by the International Federation of the Phonographic Industry (IFPI). Simpson has received two nominations.

|-
| rowspan="2" style="text-align:center;"|2005
|Herself
|World's Best Selling Pop/Rock Artist 
|
|-
|Herself
|World's Best Selling New Female Artist
|
|-

References

Awards and nominations
Awards and nominations received by Ashlee Simpson
Simpson, Ashlee